Satelit is the first EP by the Serbian band Smak, released in 1976.

Track listing

Personnel 
 Boris Aranđelović - vocals
 Radomir Mihajlović "Točak" - guitar
 Laza Ristovski - keyboards
 Zoran Milanović - bass
 Slobodan Stojanović "Kepa" - drums, congas, gong

External links

Smak albums
1976 debut EPs
Serbian-language albums
ZKP RTLJ EPs